Mark Weorpel is a guitar player and vocal performer who specializes in rock music and has played in bands including, Blackfoot, Warp Drive, and Them Pesky Kids.

Music career
While part of the band Blackfoot, Weorpel played guitar alongside of the Lynyrd Skynyrd guitarist Rick Medlocke. Weorpel has composed songs including all ten tracks on Warp Drive's Compact disk that is titled Gimmie Gimmie. Weorpel left Blackfoot after Medlocke started writing songs in the country genre. Mark Weorpel currently is the lead guitarist for the band Them Pesky Kids. Mark also teaches guitar to students at a variety of skill levels. He now lives in Minnesota on a hobby farm.

References

Living people
American rock guitarists
American male guitarists
American male singers
Year of birth missing (living people)
Place of birth missing (living people)